I Left My Heart... is a live album by pianist Red Garland featuring saxophonist Leo Wright which was recorded at Keystone Korner in 1978 and released on the Muse label in 1985.

Reception

The AllMusic review by Scott Yanow called it an "enjoyable outing" and stated, "The set was recorded live at San Francisco's Keystone Korner and was clearly a happy occasion".

Track listing
 "Will You Still Be Mine?" (Tom Adair, Matt Dennis) – 5:52
 "Please Send Me Someone to Love" (Percy Mayfield) – 6:13
 "Bye Bye Blackbird" (Ray Henderson, Mort Dixon) – 6:30
 "Body and Soul" (Johnny Green, Frank Eyton, Edward Heyman, Robert Sour) – 5:56
 "Bags' Groove" (Milt Jackson) – 8:24
 "I Left My Heart in San Francisco" (George Cory, Douglass Cross) – 5:33

Personnel
Red Garland – piano
Leo Wright – alto saxophone (tracks: 4-6)
Chris Amberger – bass
Eddie Moore – drums

References

Muse Records live albums
Red Garland live albums
1985 live albums
Albums recorded at Keystone Korner